Schwanheim is a quarter of Frankfurt am Main, Germany. It is part of the Ortsbezirk West and is subdivided into the Stadtbezirke Schwanheim, Goldstein-Ost and Goldstein-West.

References

Districts of Frankfurt